This article shows the rosters of all participating teams at the 2019 FIVB Volleyball Women's World Cup in Japan.

The following is the Argentine roster in the 2019 FIVB Volleyball Women's World Cup.

Head coach: Hernan Ferraro

The following is the Brazilian roster in the 2019 FIVB Volleyball Women's World Cup.

Head coach: José Roberto Guimarães

The following is the Cameroonian roster in the 2019 FIVB Volleyball Women's World Cup.

Head coach: Jean-René Akono

The following is the Chinese roster in the 2019 FIVB Volleyball Women's World Cup.

Head coach: Lang Ping

The following is the Dominican roster in the 2019 FIVB Volleyball Women's World Cup.

Head coach:  Marcos Kwiek

The following is the Japanese roster in the 2019 FIVB Volleyball Women's World Cup.

Head coach: Kumi Nakada

The following is the Kenyan roster in the 2019 FIVB Volleyball Women's World Cup.

Head coach: Paul Busienei Bitok

The following is the Dutch roster in the 2019 FIVB Volleyball Women's World Cup.

Head coach:  Jamie Morrison

The following is the Russian roster in the 2019 FIVB Volleyball Women's World Cup.

Head coach:  Sergio Busato

The following is the Serbian roster in the 2019 FIVB Volleyball Women's World Cup.

Head coach: Aleksandar Vladisavljev

The following is the Korean roster in the 2019 FIVB Volleyball Women's World Cup.

Head coach:  Stefano Lavarini

The following is the American roster in the 2019 FIVB Volleyball Women's World Cup.

Head coach: Karch Kiraly

References

External links
Official website

F
S